Ham may refer to:
Hyam language of Nigeria
Ham dialect of the Masana language of Chad
Marik language of Papua New Guinea